The Academy Award for Best Picture is one of the Academy Awards presented annually by the Academy of Motion Picture Arts and Sciences (AMPAS) since the awards debuted in 1929. This award goes to the producers of the film and is the only category in which every member of the Oscars is eligible to submit a nomination and vote on the final ballot. The Best Picture category is traditionally the final award of the night and is widely considered as the most prestigious honor of the ceremony.

The Grand Staircase columns at the Dolby Theatre in Hollywood, where the Academy Awards ceremonies have been held since 2002, showcase every film that has won the Best Picture title since the award's inception. There have been 591 films nominated for Best Picture and 95 winners.

History

Category name changes
At the 1st Academy Awards ceremony (for 1927 and 1928), there were two categories of awards that were each considered the top award of the night: "Outstanding Picture" and "Unique and Artistic Picture," the former being won by the war epic Wings, and the latter by the art film Sunrise. Each award was intended to honor different and equally important aspects of superior filmmaking. In particular, The Jazz Singer was disqualified from both awards, since its use of synchronized sound made the film a sui generis item that would have unfairly competed against either category, and the Academy granted the film an honorary award instead.

The following year, the Academy dropped the Unique and Artistic Picture award, decided retroactively that the award won by Wings was the highest honor that could be awarded, and allowed synchronized sound films to compete for the award. Although the award kept the title Outstanding Picture for the next ceremony, the name underwent several changes over the years as seen below. Since 1962, the award has been simply called Best Picture.

 1927/28–1928/29: Academy Award for Outstanding Picture
 1929/30–1940: Academy Award for Outstanding Production
 1941–1943: Academy Award for Outstanding Motion Picture
 1944–1961: Academy Award for Best Motion Picture
 1962–present: Academy Award for Best Picture

Recipients
Until 1950, this award was presented to a representative of the production company. That year the protocol was changed so that the award was presented to all credited producers. This rule was modified in 1999 to apply a maximum limit of three producers receiving the award, after the five producers of Shakespeare in Love had received the award.

, the "Special Rules for the Best Picture of the Year Award" limit recipients to those who meet two main requirements:
 Those with screen credit of "producer" or "produced by", explicitly excluding those with the screen credit "executive producer, co-producer, associate producer, line producer, or produced in association with"
 those three or fewer producers who have performed the major portion of the producing functions
The rules allow  team of not more than two people shall be considered to be a single “producer” if the two individuals have had an established producing partnership as determined by the Producers Guild of America Producing Partnership Panel. Final determination of the qualifying producer nominees for each nominated picture will be made by the Producers Branch Executive Committee, including the right to name any additional qualified producer as a nominee.

The Academy can make exceptions to the limit, as when Anthony Minghella and Sydney Pollack were posthumously included among the four producers nominated for The Reader.  the Producers Branch Executive Committee determines such exceptions, noting they take place only in "rare and extraordinary circumstance[s]."

Steven Spielberg currently holds the record for most nominations at twelve, winning one, while Kathleen Kennedy holds the record for most nominations without a win at eight. Sam Spiegel and Saul Zaentz tie for the most wins with three each. As for the time when the Oscar was given to production companies instead, Metro-Goldwyn-Mayer holds the record with five wins and 40 nominations.

Best Picture and Best Director
The Academy Awards for Best Picture and Best Director have been closely linked throughout their history. Of the 94 films that have won Best Picture, 67 have also been awarded Best Director. Only six films have been awarded Best Picture without receiving a Best Director nomination: Wings directed by William A. Wellman (1927/28), Grand Hotel directed by Edmund Goulding (1931/32), Driving Miss Daisy directed by Bruce Beresford (1989), Argo directed by Ben Affleck (2012), Green Book directed by Peter Farrelly (2018), and CODA directed by Sian Heder (2021). The only two Best Director winners to win for films that did not receive a Best Picture nomination were during the early years of the awards: Lewis Milestone for Two Arabian Knights (1927/28), and Frank Lloyd for The Divine Lady (1928/29).

Nomination limit increased
On June 24, 2009, AMPAS announced that the number of films to be nominated in the Best Picture award category would increase from five to ten, starting with the 82nd Academy Awards (2009). Although the Academy never officially said so, many commenters noted the expansion was likely in part a response to public criticism of The Dark Knight and WALL-E (both 2008) (and, in previous years, other blockbusters and popular films) not being nominated for Best Picture. Officially, the Academy said the rule change was a throwback to the Academy's early years in the 1930s and 1940s, when eight to 12 films were nominated each year. "Having 10 Best Picture nominees is going to allow Academy voters to recognize and include some of the fantastic movies that often show up in the other Oscar categories but have been squeezed out of the race for the top prize," AMPAS President Sid Ganis said in a press conference. "I can't wait to see what that list of 10 looks like when the nominees are announced in February."

At the same time, the voting system was switched from first-past-the-post to instant runoff voting (also known as preferential voting). In 2011, the Academy revised the rule again so that the number of films nominated was between five and ten; nominated films must earn either 5% of first-place rankings or 5% after an abbreviated variation of the single transferable vote nominating process. Bruce Davis, the Academy executive director at the time, said, "A Best Picture nomination should be an indication of extraordinary merit. If there are only eight pictures that truly earn that honor in a given year, we shouldn't feel an obligation to round out the number." This system lasted until 2021, when the Academy reverted back to a set number of ten nominees from the 94th Academy Awards onward.

Language and country of origin
Only fourteen non-English language films have been nominated in the category: La Grande Illusion (French, 1938); Z (French, 1969); The Emigrants (Swedish, 1972); Cries and Whispers (Swedish, 1973); The Postman (Il Postino) (Italian/Spanish, 1995); Life Is Beautiful (Italian, 1998); Crouching Tiger, Hidden Dragon (Mandarin Chinese, 2000); Letters from Iwo Jima (Japanese, 2006, but ineligible for Best Foreign Language Film because it was an American production); Amour (French, 2012); Roma (Spanish/Mixtec, 2018); Parasite (Korean, 2019); Minari (Korean, 2020, but ineligible for Best International Feature Film because it was an American production); Drive My Car (Japanese, 2021) and All Quiet on the Western Front (German, 2022). Parasite became the first film not in English to win Best Picture.

Only ten films wholly financed outside the United States have won Best Picture, eight of which were financed, in part or in whole, by the United Kingdom: Hamlet (1948), Tom Jones (1963), A Man for All Seasons (1966), Chariots of Fire (1981), Gandhi (1982), The Last Emperor (1987), Slumdog Millionaire (2008), and The King's Speech (2010). The ninth film, The Artist (2011), was financed in France and the tenth film, Parasite (2019), was financed in South Korea.

Rating
Since 1968, most Best Picture winners have been rated R under the Motion Picture Association's rating system. Oliver! is the only G-rated film and Midnight Cowboy is the only X-rated (now NC-17) film, so far, to win Best Picture; they won in back-to-back years, 1968 and 1969. The latter has since been downgraded to an R rating. Eleven films have won with a PG rating: the first was Patton (1970) and the most recent was Driving Miss Daisy (1989). Eleven more films have won with a PG-13 rating (which was introduced in 1984): the first was The Last Emperor (1987) and the most recent was CODA (2021).

Genres
Some genres of film (or mediums in the case of an animation) have received few or no nominations or awards. Only three animated films have been nominated: Beauty and the Beast (1991), Up (2009) and Toy Story 3 (2010). The latter two were nominated after the Academy expanded the number of nominees, but none have won. No comic book or superhero film has won, and only three have ever been nominated: Skippy (1931), Black Panther (2018), and Joker (2019). Only two fantasy films have won: The Lord of the Rings: The Return of the King (2003) and The Shape of Water (2017), although more have been nominated. The Silence of the Lambs (1991) is the only horror film to win Best Picture, and only five others have been nominated for Best Picture: The Exorcist (1973), Jaws (1975), The Sixth Sense (1999), Black Swan (2010), and Get Out (2017). Several science-fiction films have been nominated for Best Picture, though Everything Everywhere All at Once (2022) was the first one to win.

No documentary feature has yet been nominated for Best Picture, although Chang was nominated in the "Unique and Artistic Production" category at the 1927/28 awards.

Several musical adaptations based on material previously filmed in non-musical form have won Best Picture, including Gigi, West Side Story, My Fair Lady, The Sound of Music, Oliver!, and Chicago.

Several epics or historical epic films have won Best Picture, including the first recipient Wings. Others include Cimarron, Cavalcade, Gone with the Wind, The Bridge on the River Kwai, Ben-Hur, Lawrence of Arabia, Patton, The Godfather, The Godfather Part II, The Last Emperor, Dances with Wolves, Schindler’s List, Forrest Gump, Braveheart, The English Patient, Titanic, Gladiator, and The Lord of the Rings: The Return of the King.

Sequel nominations and winners
Nine films that were presented as direct sequels have been nominated for Best Picture: The Bells of St. Mary's (1945; the sequel to the 1944 winner, Going My Way), The Godfather Part II (1974), The Godfather Part III (1990), The Lord of the Rings: The Two Towers (2002), The Lord of the Rings: The Return of the King (2003), Toy Story 3 (2010), Mad Max: Fury Road (2015), Avatar: The Way of Water (2022) and Top Gun: Maverick (2022). Toy Story 3, Mad Max: Fury Road and Top Gun: Maverick are the only sequels to be nominated without any predecessors being nominated. The Godfather Part II and The Lord of the Rings: The Return of the King are the only sequels to have won the award, and their respective trilogies are the only series to have three films nominated. The Godfather series is the only film series with multiple Best Picture winners, with the first film winning the award for 1972 and the second film winning the award for 1974.

Another nominee, Broadway Melody of 1936, was a follow-up of sorts to previous winner The Broadway Melody, but beyond the title and some music, the two films have mutually independent stories. The Silence of the Lambs was adapted from the sequel novel to Red Dragon. The latter had been adapted for film as Manhunter by a different studio, and the two films have different casts and creative teams and were not presented as a series. The Lion in Winter features Peter O'Toole as King Henry II, a role he had played previously in the film Becket, but The Lion in Winter is not a sequel to Becket. Similarly, The Queen features Michael Sheen as Tony Blair, a role he had played previously in the television film The Deal. Christine Langan, producer of both productions, described The Queen as not being a direct sequel, only that it reunited the same creative team. Clint Eastwood's Letters from Iwo Jima was a companion piece to his film Flags of Our Fathers that was released earlier the same year. These two films depict the same battle from the different viewpoints of Japanese and United States military forces; the two films were shot back-to-back. In addition, Black Panther is a continuation of the events that occurred in Captain America: Civil War and the Marvel Cinematic Universe.

Remake nominations and winners
Along similar lines to sequels, there have been few nominees and winners that are either remakes or adaptations of the same source materials or subjects. Ben-Hur, which won Best Picture of 1959, is a remake of the 1925 silent film with a similar title and both were adapted from Lew Wallace's 1880 novel Ben-Hur: A Tale of the Christ. The Departed, which won Best Picture of 2006, is a remake of the 2002 Hong Kong film Infernal Affairs and is the first remake of a non-English language or international film to win. Other nominees include 1963's Cleopatra about the title last queen of Egypt following the 1934 version, 2018's A Star is Born following the 1937 film of the same name, and 2019's Little Women following the 1933 film of the same name with both being adaptations of the 1868 novel. True Grit, which was nominated for Best Picture of 2010, is the second adaptation of Charles Portis's 1968 novel following the 1969 film of the same name. Four of the nominees for the 94th ceremony were based on source material previously made into films: CODA, Dune, Nightmare Alley, and West Side Story. The 2021 version of West Side Story became the second adaptation of the same source material for a previous Best Picture winner to be nominated for the same award after 1962's Mutiny on the Bounty. For that same ceremony, CODA became the second remake of a non-English-language or international film to win. The 2022 German-language All Quiet on the Western Front is the second adaptation of the 1929 novel after the 1930 English-language film, and the third adaptation of the same source material of a previous Best Picture winner.

Silent film winners
At the 1st Academy Awards, the Best Picture award (then named "Academy Award for Outstanding Picture") was presented to the 1927 silent film Wings.

The Artist (2011) was the first essentially silent (with the exception of a single scene of dialogue, and a dream sequence with sound effects) film since Wings to win Best Picture. It was the first silent nominee since 1928's The Patriot. It was the first Best Picture winner to be produced entirely in black-and-white since 1960's The Apartment. (Schindler's List, the 1993 winner, was predominantly black-and-white but contains some color sequences.)

Version availability
No Best Picture winner has been lost, though a few such as All Quiet on the Western Front and Lawrence of Arabia exist only in a form altered from their original, award-winning release form. This has usually been due to editing for reissue (and subsequently partly restored by archivists). Other winners and nominees, such as Tom Jones (prior to its 2018 reissues by The Criterion Collection and the British Film Institute) and Star Wars, are widely available only in subsequently altered versions. The Broadway Melody originally had some sequences photographed in two-color Technicolor. This footage survives only in black and white.

The 1928 film The Patriot is the only Best Picture nominee that is lost (about one-third is extant). The Racket, also from 1928, was believed lost for many years until a print was found in Howard Hughes' archives. It has since been restored and shown on Turner Classic Movies. The only surviving complete prints of 1931's East Lynne and 1934's The White Parade exist within the UCLA film archive.

Ceremony mistake
In 2017, at the 89th Academy Awards, presenter Faye Dunaway read La La Land as the winner of the award. However, she and Warren Beatty had mistakenly been given the duplicate envelope for the "Best Actress in a Leading Role" award, which Emma Stone had won for her role in La La Land moments prior. In the resulting chaos, it was La La Land producer Jordan Horowitz who finally announced—two minutes and twenty-seven seconds later—that Moonlight was the real winner.

Diversity standards
The Academy has established a set of "representation and inclusion standards" which a film will be required to satisfy in order to compete in the Best Picture category, starting with the 96th Academy Awards for films released in 2023. There are four general standards, of which a film must satisfy two to be considered for Best Picture: (a) on-screen representation, themes and narratives; (b) creative leadership and project team; (c) industry access and opportunities; and (d) audience development. As explained by Vox, the standards "basically break down into two big buckets: standards promoting more inclusive representation and standards promoting more inclusive employment". The standards are intended to provide greater opportunities for employment, in cast, crew, studio apprenticeships and internships, and development, marketing, publicity, and distribution executives, among underrepresented racial and ethnic groups, women, LGBTQ+ people, and persons with cognitive or physical disabilities, or who are deaf or hard of hearing.

For the 94th and 95th Academy Awards (films released in 2021 and 2022), filmmakers were required to submit a confidential Academy Inclusion Standards form to be considered for Best Picture but were not required to fulfill the standards. These standards will only apply to the Best Picture category and do not affect a film's eligibility in other Oscar categories.

Winners and nominees
In the list below, winners are listed first in the gold row, followed by the other nominees. Except for the early years (when the Academy used a non-calendar year), the year shown is the one in which the film first premiered in Los Angeles County, California; normally this is also the year of first release, however, it may be the year after first release (as with Casablanca and, if the film-festival premiere is considered, Crash). This is also the year before the ceremony at which the award is given; for example, a film exhibited theatrically during 2005 was eligible for consideration for the 2005 Best Picture Oscar, awarded in 2006. The number of the ceremony (1st, 2nd, etc.) appears in parentheses after the awards year, linked to the article on that ceremony. Each individual entry shows the title followed by nominee.

Until 1950, the Best Picture award was given to the production company; from 1951 on, it has gone to the producer or producers. The Academy used the producer credits of the Producers Guild of America (PGA) until 1998, when all five producers of Shakespeare in Love made speeches after its win. A three-producer limit has been applied some years since. There was controversy over the exclusion of some PGA-credited producers of Crash and Little Miss Sunshine. The Academy can make exceptions to the limit, as when Anthony Minghella and Sydney Pollack were posthumously among the four nominated for The Reader. However, now any number of producers on a film can be nominated for Best Picture, should they be deemed eligible.

For the first ceremony, three films were nominated for the award. For the following three years, five films were nominated for the award. This was expanded to eight in 1933, to ten in 1934, and to twelve in 1935, before being dropped back to ten in 1937. In 1945, it was further reduced to five. This number remained until 2009, when the limit was raised to ten; it was adjusted from 2011 to 2020 to vary between five and ten, but has been a full ten since 2021.

For the first six ceremonies, the eligibility period spanned two calendar years. For example, the 2nd Academy Awards presented on April 3, 1930, recognized films that were released between August 1, 1928, and July 31, 1929. Starting with the 7th Academy Awards, held in 1935, the period of eligibility became the full previous calendar year from January 1 to December 31. This has been the rule every year since except 2020, when the end date was extended to February 28, 2021, due to the COVID-19 pandemic, and 2021, which was correspondingly limited to March 1 to December 31.

1920s

1930s

1940s

1950s

1960s

1970s

1980s

1990s

2000s

2010s

2020s

Individuals with multiple wins

3 wins
 Sam Spiegel 
 Saul Zaentz

2 wins
 Clint Eastwood
 Arthur Freed
 Dede Gardner
 Jeremy Kleiner
 Branko Lustig
 Albert S. Ruddy
 Robert Wise

Individuals with multiple nominations

12 nominations
 Steven Spielberg

9 nominations
 Scott Rudin

8 nominations
 Kathleen Kennedy

7 nominations
 Dede Gardner

6 nominations
 Eric Fellner
 Jeremy Kleiner
 Stanley Kramer

5 nominations
 Tim Bevan
 Francis Ford Coppola
 Clint Eastwood
 Frank Marshall

4 nominations
 Warren Beatty
 James L. Brooks
 David Brown
 Ethan Coen
 Bradley Cooper
 Megan Ellison
 Donna Gigliotti
 Peter Jackson
 Norman Jewison
 Graham King
 Kristie Macosko Krieger
 Sydney Pollack
 David Puttnam
 Sam Spiegel 
 George Stevens 
 Irwin Winkler

3 nominations
 Paul Thomas Anderson
 Lawrence Bender
 Jason Blum
 James Cameron
 Iain Canning
 Ceán Chaffin
 Robert Chartoff
 Joel Coen
 Bruce Cohen
 Christian Colson
 Michael De Luca
 Steve Golin
 Brian Grazer
 David Heyman
 Alejandro González Iñárritu
 Emma Tillinger Koskoff
 Stanley Kubrick
 Jon Landau
 Robert Lorenz
 Ismail Merchant
 Barrie M. Osborne
 Brad Pitt
 Marc Platt
 Martin Scorsese
 Emile Sherman
 Hal B. Wallis
 Fran Walsh
 Robert Wise
 Saul Zaentz
 Richard D. Zanuck

2 nominations
 Buddy Adler
 Robert Altman
 Kathryn Bigelow
 Mark Boal
 John Boorman
 John Brabourne
 Graham Broadbent
 Lisa Bruce
 Dana Brunetti
 Jim Burke
 Peter Chernin
 Alfonso Cuarón
 Pete Czernin
 J. Miles Dale
 Guillermo del Toro
 Cecil B. DeMille
 Finola Dwyer 
 Todd Field
 John Foreman
 Gray Frederickson
 Arthur Freed
 Richard N. Gladstein
 Jonathan Gordon
 Ed Guiney
 Jerome Hellman
 Grant Heslov
 Grant Hill
 Ron Howard
 Stanley R. Jaffe
 Dan Janvey
 Dan Jinks
 Mark Johnson
 Ross Katz
 A. Kitman Ho
 Arnold Kopelson
 Gary Kurtz
 Ang Lee
 Ernest Lehman
 Baz Luhrmann
 Daniel Lupi
 Branko Lustig
 Michael Mann
 Anthony McCarten

 Frank McCarthy
 Martin McDonagh
 Frances McDormand
 Adam McKay
 Barry Mendel
 Kevin Messick
 Arnon Milchan
 George Miller
 Doug Mitchell
 Gil Netter
 Patrick J. Palmer
 Mary Parent
 David Parfitt
 Amy Pascal
 Jordan Peele
 Julia Phillips
 Michael Phillips
 Amanda Posey
 Sean McKittrick
 Christopher Nolan
 Fred Roos
 Albert S. Ruddy
 Tracey Seaward
 Ronald L. Schwary
 JoAnne Sellar
 Michael Shamberg
 Stacey Sher
 Bernard Smith
 Peter Spears
 Ray Stark
 Oliver Stone
 Emma Thomas
 Jenno Topping
 Douglas Urbanski
 Jerry Wald
 Jack L. Warner
 Harvey Weinstein
 Douglas Wick
 James Woolf
 John Woolf
 William Wyler
 Peter Yates
 Sam Zimbalist
 Fred Zinnemann
 Edward Zwick

Production companies with multiple nominations and wins

Columbia Pictures has the most wins with 12, while 20th Century Studios has the most nominations with 63. Focus Features has the most nominations without a win with 11.

See also
 BAFTA Award for Best Film
 Independent Spirit Award for Best Film
 Critics' Choice Movie Award for Best Picture
 Golden Globe Award for Best Motion Picture – Drama
 Golden Globe Award for Best Motion Picture – Musical or Comedy
 Producers Guild of America Award for Best Theatrical Motion Picture
 Screen Actors Guild Award for Outstanding Performance by a Cast in a Motion Picture
 List of superlative Academy Award winners and nominees
 List of presenters of the Academy Award for Best Picture
 List of Big Five Academy Award winners and nominees
 Golden Raspberry Award for Worst Picture
 List of Academy Award-winning films
 List of film production companies
 List of films considered the best
 Lists of films
 Academy Aperture 2025

Notes

References

External links
 Oscars.org (official Academy site)
 Oscar.com (official ceremony site)
 The Academy Awards Database (official site)

Awards established in 1929
Picture
Awards for best film